The 1998 ICC Champions trophy (officially known as Wills International Cup) was a One Day International cricket tournament held in Bangladesh. It was the first tournament apart from the World Cups to involve all test playing nations. New Zealand defeated Zimbabwe in a pre-quarter final match to qualify for the main knockout stage. Future editions of this tournament are now known as the ICC Champions Trophy. Appearing in their only major tournament final, South Africa defeated the West Indies in the final to win the event. This tournament was inaugurated on the basis of FIFA Confederations Cup where the best teams from their respected confederations compete against each other but in this case the top teams in the ICC ODI Championship compete with each other.

History
The ICC conceived the idea of a short cricket tournament to raise funds for the development of the game in non-test playing countries. The tournament, later dubbed as the mini-World Cup as it involved all of the full members of the ICC, was planned as a knock-out tournament so that it was short and did not reduce the value and importance of the World Cup.

Venue
The ICC decided to award the tournament to Bangladesh to promote the game in that nation. Bangladesh did not participate as they were not a test playing nation at that time despite winning the 1997 ICC Trophy and qualifying for the 1999 Cricket World Cup. One of the worst ever floods of the region threatened to ruin the tournament. However, the tournament eventually went ahead and the Bangladesh Cricket Board promised to donate 10% of the gate money to the Prime Minister's Fund for flood relief.

Fixtures
The tournament was held in a direct knock-out format and involved all of the test playing countries of the time. There were 9 countries eligible which meant that 2 countries would play a qualifier knockout to determine the final 8 teams. Initially, it was announced that the 9 teams would be ranked according to the 1996 Cricket World Cup seedings. However, the draw that was eventually released appeared to have been tweaked in favour of some of the teams with larger followings and saw New Zealand play Zimbabwe in order to qualify for the main draw.

Squads

All nine Test cricket nations participated in the tournament. The teams could name a preliminary squad of 30, but only 14-man squads were permitted for the actual tournament, one month before the start of the tournament.

Results

The next day, the main tournament got underway in a straight knock-out format

Summary of matches

Preliminary match

Quarter finals

Semi finals
The first semi-final was played between South Africa and Sri Lanka on 30 October 1998 in Dhaka. On the rainy day, the match was initially reduced to 39 overs per innings. South Africa batted first and scored 240 runs for 7 wickets. Jacques Kallis scored 113 not out runs from 100 balls. The second innings was further reduced by 5 overs and the revising target was 224 runs in 34 overs. Sri Lanka scored 132 all out in 23.1 overs. Sanath Jayasuriya was Sri Lanka's highest run-scorer with 22 runs. South Africa won the match by 92 runs applying the Duckworth–Lewis method (D/L method). Kallis was awarded the man of the match for his performance.

West Indies played India in the second semi-final of the tournament on 31 October 1998 in Dhaka. India won the toss and decided to bat first. They scored 242 runs for 6 wickets in 50 overs, including Sourav Ganguly's 83 runs from 116 balls. Dillon finished with 3 wickets for 38 runs in 8 overs. West Indies started their innings aggressively, reaching 100 runs in 15 overs. They achieved the target in 47 overs losing 4 wickets. Shivnarine Chanderpaul scored 74 runs in the West Indian innings. Dillon was named the man of the match.

Final

The final of the inaugural edition was played between South Africa and West Indies on 1 November 1998 at Bangabandhu National Stadium, Dhaka. After losing the toss, West Indies were invited to bat, and scored 245 runs in 49.3 overs. Kallis took 5 wickets conceding 30 runs in 7.3 overs. South Africa achieved the target in 47 overs losing 6 wickets, with Hansie Cronje and Mike Rindel scoring 61 not out and 49 runs respectively. Kallis scored 37 runs, and was named the man of the match for his performance. He also received the man of the tournament award. With this victory, South Africa won the inaugural edition of the ICC KnockOut Trophy.

Statistics

Team totals

Highest team totals

Batting

Most runs in the tournament

Highest average in the tournament

Highest individual scores

Highest partnerships

References

External links
 CricketArchive

 
1998
1998 in cricket
International cricket competitions from 1997–98 to 2000
1998 in Bangladeshi cricket